Michael R. Shute (21 September 1951 - 3 January 2020 in Halifax, Nova Scotia) was a Canadian scholar and Professor of Religious Studies at Memorial University of Newfoundland. He was known for his research on the works of Bernard Lonergan and moral decision-making.
Shute was a co-editor of Journal of Macrodynamic Analysis.

Shute received a diagnosis of ALS.  As a result, he retired from teaching in September 2019, and died on January 3, 2020.

Books
 Lonergan's Discovery of the Science of Economics, University of Toronto Press, 2010
 Lonergan's Early Economic Research, University of Toronto Press, 2010
 Improving Moral Decision-Making (with William Zanardi). Axial Press, 2003
 The Origins of Lonergan's Notion of the Dialectic of History, University Press of America, 1993

References

External links
Michael Shute at Memorial University of Newfoundland

1951 births
2020 deaths
University of Toronto alumni
Acadia University alumni
Academic staff of the Memorial University of Newfoundland
Philosophers of religion
Atlantic School of Theology alumni
Canadian Christian theologians
Religious studies scholars
Lonergan scholars
Deaths from motor neuron disease
Place of birth missing
Neurological disease deaths in Nova Scotia